Lamar is a city in Johnson County, Arkansas, United States. The population was 1,605 at the 2010 census, up from 1,415 at the 2000 census.

Geography
Lamar is located in southeastern Johnson County at  (35.440546, -93.392764), in the valley of Cabin Creek. U.S. Route 64 is Lamar's Main Street and leads northwest  to Clarksville, the county seat, and south  to Knoxville.

Demographics

2020 census

As of the 2020 United States census, there were 1,719 people, 747 households, and 486 families residing in the city.

2000 census
As of the census of 2000, there were 1,415 people, 529 households, and 362 families residing in the city. The racial makeup of the city was 95.97% White, 0.14% Black or African American, 1.13% Native American, 0.21% Asian, 0.64% from other races, and 1.91% from two or more races.  3.46% of the population were Hispanic or Latino of any race.

There were 529 households, out of which 35.5% had children under the age of 18 living with them, 51.6% were married couples living together, 12.1% had a female householder with no husband present, and 31.4% were non-families. 28.0% of all households were made up of individuals, and 11.9% had someone living alone who was 65 years of age or older.  The average household size was 2.54 and the average family size was 3.05.

In the city, the population was spread out, with 25.8% under the age of 18, 9.6% from 18 to 24, 27.4% from 25 to 44, 21.5% from 45 to 64, and 15.7% who were 65 years of age or older.  The median age was 36 years. For every 100 females, there were 92.3 males.  For every 100 females age 18 and over, there were 92.0 males.

The median income for a household in the city was $23,317, and the median income for a family was $27,143. Males had a median income of $23,309 versus $16,207 for females. The per capita income for the city was $11,852.  About 14.8% of families and 17.7% of the population were below the poverty line, including 18.7% of those under age 18 and 15.2% of those age 65 or over.

Education 
Public education for early childhood, elementary and secondary students is primarily provided by the Lamar School District, which includes:

 Lamar Elementary School, serving pre-kindergarten through grade 3.
 Lamar Middle School, serving grades 4 through 7.
 Lamar High School, serving grades 8 through 12.

Notable people
Lee Cazort, the youngest ever Speaker of the Arkansas House of Representatives and youngest ever Lieutenant Governor of Arkansas, attended public school in Lamar before moving to Fort Smith.

References

Cities in Johnson County, Arkansas